Recipients of the honorary citizenship of Berlin, in order of date of presentation. In total 119 people have been awarded honorary citizenship.

1813-1850
Konrad Gottlieb Ribbeck
Heinrich Falckenberg
Gebhard Leberecht von Blücher
Ernst Ludwig Heim
Ludwig Matthias Nathanael Gottlieb von Brauchitsch
Friedrich von Schuckmann
Carl Friedrich Ludwig von Gontard
Friedrich Hansmann
Carl Friedrich Heinrich Graf von Wylich und Lottum
Heinrich von Gerlach
Friedrich August von Staegemann
Ludwig Wilhelm Neumann
Nicholas I of Russia
Johann Philipp von Ladenberg
Karl Albert von Kamptz
Gustav von Rauch
Friedrich Magnus von Bassewitz
Karl Freiherr von Müffling
Hermann von Boyen
Carl Streckfuß
Johann Christian Krüger
Ludwig von Borstell
Johann David Heegewaldt
Carl August Alsleben
Eugen von Puttkammer
Christian von Rother
Heinrich von Gagern
Friedrich Wilhelm, Count Brandenburg
Friedrich Graf von Wrangel

1851-1900
Otto Theodor von Manteuffel
Christian Daniel Rauch
Alexander von Humboldt
Eduard Heinrich von Flottwell
Philipp August Böckh
Samuel Marot
Heinrich Wilhelm Krausnick
Otto von Bismarck
Helmuth von Moltke the Elder
Friedrich Heinrich Eduard Kochhann
Heinrich Schliemann
Leopold von Ranke
Robert Koch
Rudolf Virchow
Adolph Menzel
Paul Langerhans
Heinrich Bertram

1904-1949

Arthur Hobrecht
Albert Haack
Arnold Marggraff
Martin Kirschner
Paul Michelet
Oskar Cassel
Ferdinand Straßmann
Ludwig Hoffmann
Hermann Bamberg
Hugo Heimann
Max Liebermann
Paul von Hindenburg (Honorary citizenship rescinded)
Adolf Hitler (Honorary citizenship rescinded)
Hermann Göring (Honorary citizenship rescinded)
Joseph Goebbels (Honorary citizenship rescinded)
Wilhelm Frick (Honorary citizenship rescinded)
Paul Lincke
Wilhelm Pieck (Honorary citizenship rescinded)
Rudolf Wissell
Theodor Heuss

1955-2000
Paul Löbe
Louise Schroeder
Jakob Kaiser
F. K. Otto Dibelius
Marie Elisabeth Lüders
Heinrich Lübke
Lucius D. Clay
Otto Heinrich Warburg
Konrad Adenauer
Nelly Sachs
Otto Hahn
Hans Scharoun
Otto Nagel
Heinrich Zille
Karl Schmidt-Rottluff
Heinrich Grüber
Willy Brandt
Ferdinand Friedensburg
Franz Neumann
Hans Reif
Herbert von Karajan
Gustav Heinemann
Nikolai Berzarin
Anna Seghers
Valery Bykovsky
Sigmund Jähn
Walter Scheel
Johann Baptist Gradl
Shepard Stone
Wolfgang Heinz
Karl Carstens
John J. McCloy
Wieland Herzfelde
Heinz Galinski
Helmut Schmidt
Richard von Weizsäcker
Mikhail Gorbachev
Helmut Kohl
Ronald Reagan
Hans-Dietrich Genscher
Edzard Reuter
Roman Herzog
George H. W. Bush
Dietrich Fischer-Dieskau

2002-2022

Egon Bahr
Marlene Dietrich
Johannes Rau
Heinz Berggruen
Wolf Biermann
Werner Otto
Joachim Gauck
W. Michael Blumenthal
Wolfgang Schäuble
Inge Deutschkron
Margot Friedländer
Frank-Walter Steinmeier

Notes 
The honorary citizenships of Wilhelm Frick, Adolf Hitler, Joseph Goebbels, Hermann Göring, and Wilhelm Pieck have been revoked. The honorary citizenship of Nikolai Berzarin was revoked in 1992 but was restored in 2003.

External links
List of honorary citizens of Berlin by the Berlin House of Deputies (German)
History of honorary citizenship in Berlin (German)

Berlin, Honorary citizens of
Berlin
Honorary citizens
Honorary citizens of Berlin